NGC 216 is a lenticular galaxy located approximately 68.8 million light-years from the Sun in the constellation Cetus. It was discovered on December 9, 1784 by William Herschel.

See also 
 List of NGC objects (1–1000)

References

External links 
 
 
 SEDS

0216
Lenticular galaxies
Cetus (constellation)
2478
17840915
Discoveries by William Herschel